Cloud 9 Adventures is a provider of reservations, travel services, marketing, consulting, and brand management for destination music events. The company specializes in planning, promoting, and executing multi-day music events on fully chartered luxury cruise ships and at all-inclusive resorts. Cloud 9 Adventures services range from consulting on new events, working with preferred vendors, facilitating international logistics and being a fully licensed travel service provider to handle all event sales and reservations. The Cloud 9 Adventures ethos is modeled around luxury concert vacations.

The company was founded in 2002 and is based in Delray Beach, Florida. Cloud 9 Adventures' music cruises leave out of various ports in Florida, most recently out of PortMiami in Miami, Florida, and Port Canaveral in Cocoa Beach, Florida. Current and past destination music events have been located in at all-inclusive resorts in Mexico, Jamaica, and the Dominican Republic. The Cloud 9 Adventures event season typically runs from December until March. The Customer Service / Travel Team of Cloud 9 Adventures handles around 20,000 reservations per event season.

Past and Current Events 

Jam Cruise
Jam Cruise is an annual five-day music vacation held aboard a 2,700 capacity luxury cruise ship, expanding across the musical genres of jam, funk, rock, jazz, and electronic with 30+ bands and a multitude of special guests. In addition to music performances, the event hosts workshops, activities, and programs with artists’ involvement throughout the duration of the event. Jam Cruise held its 16th sailing in January 2018.

Holy Ship!
Holy Ship! is an electronic dance music festival held aboard a 4,000 capacity cruise ship. 2018 marked the tenth and eleventh sailings. The event leaves out of Port Canaveral in Cocoa Beach, FL and travels to the Bahamas with a port stop at a private island. Cloud 9 Adventures presents this event in partnership with music promotion companies HARD and The Bowery Presents. 

Dominican Holidaze

In collaboration with The Disco Biscuits, Umphrey's McGee, and Sound Tribe Sector 9, 2017 marked the 11th version of this event. The event originally began in 2007 in Jamaica as Caribbean Holidaze. It then moved to Mexico under the name Mayan Holidaze. 2014 marked the first year it was held Punta Cana, Dominican Republic, at Breathless Punta Cana Resort & Spa. In 2016 it expanded and also took over adjacent resort, Now Onyx Punta Cana. Dominican Holidaze has featured premiere Jam Bands and Jamtronica acts such as Lotus, Big Gigantic, The New Deal, Papadosio, The Polish Ambassador, Cherub, Lettuce, and Joe Russo's Almost Dead.

Also known as Mayan Holidaze and Caribbean Holidaze

Strings & Sol
Strings & Sol is a bluegrass music vacation held at Now Sapphire Riviera Cancun Resort in Puerto Morelos, Mexico. The event lineup typically features Yonder Mountain String Band, Greensky Bluegrass Leftover Salmon, The Infamous Stringdusters, Railroad Earth, and other artists such as Keller Williams, Fruition, The Travelin' McCourys, and Sam Bush, depending on the lineup that year.

Panic en la Playa

Cloud 9 Adventures produces this event in collaboration with Southern Rock band, Widespread Panic. The event began in 2012 at Now Sapphire Resort in Puerto Moreles, Mexico. The next three years, Panic en la Playa Dos, Panic en la Playa Tres, and Panic en la Playa Cuatro were held in the Dominican Republic at the Hard Rock Hotel & Casino - Punta Cana. The event since moved to the Hard Rock Hotel in Riviera Maya, Mexico. 2018 marked the seventh year of the event. Additional participating artists include the Dirty Dozen Brass Band, Bloodkin, The New Mastersounds, Orgone, Big Something, along with the Playa Allstars, and The Cleaners, both of which are special groups created for the event featuring artists such as Col Bruce Hampton, George Porter Jr. Ivan Neville, Nikki Glaspie, Randall Bramblet, and Grant Green Jr.

One Big Holiday 

The 2018 event marked the fourth time Cloud 9 Adventures produced this event with American Rock band, My Morning Jacket. 
The first three renditions of One Big Holiday were held at the Hard Rock Hotel Riviera Maya, Mexico. The 2018 event moved to the Dominican Republic at Hard Rock Hotel and Casino in Punta Cana. Past participating artists have included Band of Horses, The Flaming Lips, Dr. Dog, War on Drugs, Preservation Hall Jazz Band, Dawes, and Sylvan Esso, Preservation Hall Jazz Band, Gary Clark Jr., The Head and The Heart, Kurt Vile & The Violators, Portugal. The Man, Spoon, Nathaniel Rateliff & The Night Sweats, Broken Social Scene, Moon Taxi, and many more.

At The Beach
Presented by Cloud 9 Adventures in collaboration with The Avett Brothers and Bowery Presents, At The Beach is a four-day concert vacation at the Hard Rock Hotel in Riviera Maya, Mexico featuring some of the biggest names in folk and Americana music. 2018 marked the second year of the event. Past performers include Band of Horses, Brandi Carlile, Jason Isbell, Lake Street Dive, The Devil Makes Three, Old Crow Medicine Show, John Prine, The Head and The Heart, Langhorne Slim & The Law, Jim Avett, and more. 

Closer to the Sun
Presented by Cloud 9 Adventures in collaboration with Slightly Stoopid, Closer to the Sun is a four night concert vacation at the Now Sapphire Resort in Puerto Morelos, Mexico featuring the top names in Reggae Fusion. 2017 marked the fourth year for the event. Past performers include Citizen Cope, Dirty Heads, G. Love & Special Sauce, Steel Pulse, Don Carlos, SOJA, Iration, Pepper, Ozomatli, Matisyahu, Tribal Seeds, Stick Figure, J Boog, Fortunate Youth, and Chali 2na.

Castaway with Southern Ground
Featuring Zac Brown Band, Castaway is a four-day concert vacation at the Hard Rock Hotel in Riviera Maya, Mexico featuring premier acts in pop country, folk, and reggae music. 2018 marked the third installment of the event. Castaway with Southern Ground has welcomed performers such as Kacey Musgraves, Michael Franti & Spearhead, Trombone Shorty & the Orleans Ave, Dawes, Brett Dennen, JJ Grey & Mofro, Rodrigo y Gabriela, Toots & the Maytals, Maren Morris, Margo Price, Drake White, Jake Owen, Blackberry Smoke, The Original Wailers, CAM, The Record Company, LANCO, and many more.

References 

https://www.rollingstone.com/music/news/my-morning-jacket-detail-one-big-holiday-concert-in-mexico-20140619

Hospitality companies of the United States
Companies based in Florida